The Tangshan protest occurred in 2004 after more than 11,000 farmers in Hebei Province, China, signed a petition calling for the removal of Communist Party officials who were allegedly involved in corruption.  The protest led to a crackdown on rights activists and further repression of the farmers.

Petition 
By 2004, more than eight years after they had been moved, the displaced farmers had not been properly compensated. The farmers asserted that up to 60 million yuan of compensation funds had been misappropriated by officials from the local government. They said they were owed 13,000 yuan (U.S. $1,570) per household in compensation but some had received only half the amount, while others had received nothing.

Under the leadership of Zhang Youren, a peasant activist, the farmers organised a petition. In February 2004, a group of ten farmer representatives traveled to the capital to submit their petition to the National People's Congress. In his opening speech to the Congress, Prime Minister Wen Jiabao promised a crackdown on corruption and illegal land seizures. Nevertheless, the farmers from Tangshan were rounded up by the Beijing police who accused them of being Falun Gong members and subversives.  Zhang Youren was put under pressure to denounce the 'criminals' who had supported the petition.  Zhao Yan quickly lost his job with the China Reform magazine and by the end of the year he had been imprisoned; he was still in jail two years later when the authorities finally convicted him of fraud.  Li Boguang was arrested in December 2004 but released after a few weeks on condition that he had no further involvement in farmer protests.  Yu Meisun, who had already served an earlier jail sentence, was able to publish an online diary that gave details of police harassment.

References

Further reading 
  Diary of a Peasant Advocate, Yu Meisun, China Rights Forum, 2004/3, pages 61–67   PDF. 
 Selected reports on Incidents relating to forced evictions, March 2003 - January 2005, Congressional Executive Commission on China PDF
 Property Seizure in China, Roundtable Report, 21 June 2004, Congressional Executive Commission on China PDF. 
 Ruling the Chinese Countryside: Rights Consciousness, Collective Action and Property Rights, Christopher Heurlin, 2006, University of Washington, PDF
 Chinese Society: Change Conflict and Resistance, Elizabeth Perry (ed.), 2003, Routledge

See also 
 Li Boguang, lawyer
 Zhao Yan, journalist 
 Dongzhou protests
 Empowerment and Rights Institute
 Human rights in the People's Republic of China

Conflicts in 2004
Protests in China
Political repression in China
Peasant revolts
Rural community development
2004 in China
History of Hebei
Corruption in China
Tangshan